Satish Shah (born 25 June 1951) is an Indian actor. He is best known for his comic roles in films like Jaane Bhi Do Yaaro (1983), Yeh Jo Hai Zindagi (1984), Sarabhai vs Sarabhai (2004), Main Hoon Na (2004), Kal Ho Naa Ho (2003), Fanaa (2006) and Om Shanti Om (2007).

In 2008, he also co-judged Comedy Circus with Archana Puran Singh. In 2015, he was also appointed as a member of the Film and Television Institute of India society.

Biography

Early life
Satish Shah is a Kutchi Gujarati from Mandvi. He studied at the Xavier's College and later joined Film and Television Institute of India.

Personal life
Satish Shah is married to designer Madhu Shah since 1982. 
During the COVID-19 pandemic in 2020, Shah was diagnosed with COVID-19. He was admitted to Lilavati Hospital in Mumbai on 20 July and discharged on 28 July after making a full recovery.

Career
He is perhaps best known for his roles in the 1984 sitcom Yeh Jo Hai Zindagi directed by Kundan Shah and Manjul Sinha where he ended up playing 55 different characters in 55 episodes and the character of Prakash in Television serial of Zee TV - Filmy Chakkar in 1995, which he played in 50 episodes. He has also starred in 2004's famous television show Sarabhai vs Sarabhai as Indravadhan Sarabhai. In both Filmy Chakkar and Sarabhai vs Sarabhai, his pairing was opposite Ratna Pathak Shah. In 1997, he again played lead in Ghar Jamai for 80 episodes along with serial “All The Best” with Swaroop Sampat for 109 episodes for DD2.

He played the role of Municipal Commissioner D'Mello in the 1984 movie Jaane Bhi Do Yaaro directed by Kundan Shah. Considered to be primarily a comedian, he has portrayed various character roles in his career throughout the 1980s, 1990s and 2000s, starting with his first movie Arvind Desai Ki Ajeeb Dastaan in 1978. Apart from his career in Bollywood, he was also a judge of the Comedy Circus laughter contest. He has completed over 250 feature films till date.

Filmography

Films

Television

Awards

References

External links
 
 

Indian male film actors
Indian male television actors
Indian male voice actors
Living people
20th-century Indian male actors
21st-century Indian male actors
1951 births
Kutchi people
People from Mandvi